Rhizorhabdus is a genus of bacteria. Its name is derived from the latin rhiza, meaning root, and rhabdos, meaning rod. Members of this genus, including  Rhizorhabdus wittichii and five other species with sequenced genomes, are associated with soil or plant roots.

References 

Bacteria genera
Sphingomonadales
Taxa described in 2014